Shabtai Horowitz (1590 – 12 April 1660) was a rabbi and talmudist, probably born in Ostroh, Volhynia.  He was the son of the kabbalist Isaiah Horowitz, and at an early age married the daughter of the wealthy and scholarly Moses Charif of Lublin. With his father he seems to have gone to Prague, where he occupied a position as preacher; from Prague he went as rabbi to Fürth, whence he was called to Frankfurt am Main about 1632, and finally to Vienna about 1650. 

Horowitz wrote additions to his grandfather Abraham's Emeḳ Berakah (which appeared first in the Amsterdam edition of 1729), additions to his father's prayer-book, and a treatise on religious ethics under the title Vave Ha-Ammudim. This work he modestly designated as an introduction to his father's celebrated work Shnei Luchot Ha-Brit (The Two Tablets of the Covenant), with which it is always printed as an appendix. He also wrote an ethical testament (Ẓawwa'ah, Frankfurt-on-the-Oder, n.d., often reprinted). It contains, besides some very charitable teachings, exhortations to strictness in ritual practise and in kabbalistic studies. Shabbethai further wrote some prayers (included in his father's prayer-book), especially a selichah for the 20th of Sivan.

References 
 

1590s births
1660 deaths
Year of birth uncertain
People from Ostroh
Volhynian Orthodox rabbis
17th-century Bohemian rabbis
17th-century German rabbis
Rabbis  from Frankfurt
Rabbis from Prague
Rabbis from Vienna
Polish expatriates in Germany
Polish expatriates in the Czech lands
Polish expatriates in Austria
Czech Orthodox rabbis
Austrian Orthodox rabbis
Polish Orthodox rabbis
German Orthodox rabbis